Markarian 50 is an open cluster in the Milky Way galaxy. It is about 3,460 pc away in the constellation Cassiopeia. Markarian 50 is a very young open cluster, only about 7.5 million years old. Markarian 50 may be a member of the OB association Cassiopeia OB2. The Wolf-Rayet star WR 157 is a member of Markarian 50.

References 

Open clusters
Cassiopeia (constellation)
Star-forming regions